The Atlantic City Rail Terminal is Atlantic City, New Jersey's train station, located inside of the Atlantic City Convention Center. It has five tracks served by three platforms and functions as the easternmost terminus of the NJ Transit Atlantic City Line to and from Philadelphia. The station was also served by the Atlantic City Express Service (ACES) from 2009 until it was formally discontinued on March 9, 2012.

The terminal was designed by TAT/SSVK, Architects and dedicated on May 22, 1989.
Atlantic City was once served by the old Pennsylvania-Reading Seashore Lines Atlantic City station (née Atlantic City Union Station), which had become Atlantic City Municipal Bus Terminal and was demolished in 1997.  Between 1965 and 1981 a single-story, two-track station on the present site served PRSL trains until service ended in 1981.

Station layout

Connecting service
At the station/convention center: Atlantic City Jitney casino shuttles and route 4
Two blocks south at the Atlantic City Bus Terminal: 319 to New York City  and all Atlantic County local and long-distance routes.

References

External links

 Station from Google Maps Street View

Buildings and structures in Atlantic City, New Jersey
NJ Transit Rail Operations stations
Former Amtrak stations in New Jersey
Railway stations in Atlantic County, New Jersey
Amtrak Thruway Motorcoach stations in New Jersey
Railway stations in the United States opened in 1989
1989 establishments in New Jersey